Isaac Payne, or Isaac Paine, (1854–1904) was a Black Seminole who served as a United States Army Indian Scout and received America's highest military decoration—the Medal of Honor—for his actions in the Indian Wars of the western United States.

Biography
Payne and other Black Seminoles enlisted in the army October 1871 and became known as one of the Seminole-Negro Indian Scouts. On April 25, 1875, he was serving as a trumpeter by the Pecos River in Texas where, "[w]ith 3 other men, he participated in a charge against 25 hostiles while on a scouting patrol."

A month later, on May 28, 1875, Payne was awarded the Medal of Honor for his actions during the engagement. Two of the other men who took part in the charge, Pompey Factor and John Ward, both Black Seminoles, also received Medals of Honor.

Payne was discharged in January 1901, and moved back to Mexico, where he lived until his death at age 49 or 50. He was buried at the Seminole Indian Scout Cemetery in Brackettville, Texas.

Medal of Honor citation
Rank and organization: Trumpeter, Indian Scouts. Place and date: At Pecos River, Tex., April 25, 1875. Entered service at: ------. Birth: Mexico. Date of issue: May 28, 1875.

Citation:

With 3 other men, he participated in a charge against 25 hostiles while on a scouting patrol.

See also

Adam Paine
List of Medal of Honor recipients
List of Medal of Honor recipients for the Indian Wars
List of African American Medal of Honor recipients
List of Native American Medal of Honor recipients

References

External links 

1854 births
1904 deaths
United States Army Medal of Honor recipients
Black Seminole people
Native American United States military personnel
United States Army soldiers
Foreign-born Medal of Honor recipients
United States Army Indian Scouts
American Indian Wars recipients of the Medal of Honor
20th-century African-American people
20th-century Native Americans
19th-century Native Americans